The European University Hockey League (EUHL) is the first European university league in ice hockey that was founded in 2013 and it is managed by the EUHA (the European University Hockey Association). The idea to establish a university hockey league in Europe was invented by Jaroslav Straka, who thanks to Lubomir Sekeras, Frantisek Sadecky and Peter Spankovic turned a dream into reality. Everything started with the initial thought of pan-European expansion through the creation of four divisions to save money and time: Eastern (Slovakia, Czech Republic, Austria, Poland, Hungary), Western (Germany I, France, Belgium, The Netherlands), North (Sweden, Finland, Norway, Denmark) and South (Germany II, Austria II, Switzerland, Slovenia). Presently the EUHL consists of 10 teams from 4 countries, but it is already assured that next year this number will be higher. The new applicants come from Slovakia, the Czech Republic, Austria, Sweden, Finland, Norway, Germany, United Kingdom, France, and Hungary, accompanied by American universities and associations from the USA.

Trophy 
The winner of the league is awarded the Sekeráš Championship Trophy, named after former Slovak NHL player Ľubomír Sekeráš, who is the co-founder of the league.

Divisions 
Four divisions are planned – Northern, Eastern, Southern and Western. The Northern division will contain teams from universities in Sweden, Finland, Norway, and Denmark; the Eastern division teams from Slovakia, Czech Republic, Austria, Poland, and Hungary; the Southern division teams from Germany, Switzerland, Slovenia, and Austria, and the Western division teams from France, Germany, Belgium, and the Netherlands.

For the first season in 2013–14, only six teams were involved, forming only one division.

Teams 
At the beginning of the first season only five teams were confirmed – three from Slovakia and two from the Czech Republic – even though more universities were interested in joining the league. However, on 13 November 2013 a new participant, VŠEMvs Managers from Bratislava joined the league, thus increasing the number of participants to six.

In the second season the following teams participated:

References

External links 
 Official website

College ice hockey
European student sports organizations
Ice hockey leagues in Slovakia
Ice hockey leagues in the Czech Republic
Multi-national ice hockey leagues in Europe